Meynier is a surname. Notable people with the surname include:
 André Meynier (1901–1983), French geographer
 Charles Meynier (1763 or 1768–1832), French painter
 Geronimo Meynier (born 1941), Italian teen film actor
 Jean-Baptiste Meynier (1749–1813), French general
 Octave Meynier (1874–1961), French military officer